Cape Willoughby is a headland in the Australian state of South Australia located on the east end of the Dudley Peninsula on Kangaroo Island in the gazetted locality of Willoughby about  south east of the town of Penneshaw.

Part of the cape is within the Cape Willoughby Conservation Park while the waters adjoining its northern shoreline are within the Encounter Marine Park.  The cape is the site of South Australia’s first lighthouse which was first illuminated on 16 January 1852.

Climate

See also
Willoughby, Lincolnshire

References

W
W
Dudley Peninsula